WEAX (88.3 FM) is a Christian contemporary radio station in Angola, Indiana, and is owned by Star Educational Media Network, Inc.

WEAX began broadcasting in September 1979. It was formerly the student run station Trine University and aired an Indie/Alternative radio format. On July 15, 2019, Trine University shut down FM broadcasting of WEAX, and the station was sold to Star Educational Media Network, Inc. for $40,000; the sale was consummated on January 17, 2020. However, the station remained silent, because the tower that had used by Trine University was on property owned by the City of Angola, and the city refused to allow the tower to be used by a Christian broadcaster. The station resumed operations on July 13, 2020.

References

External links

Radio stations established in 1979
1979 establishments in Indiana
Contemporary Christian radio stations in the United States
EAX